Deerlick Run (also known as Deer Lick Run) is a tributary of Fishing Creek in Columbia County, Pennsylvania, in the United States. The stream flows through Mount Pleasant Township and Orange Township. The stream's watershed has an area of 6.1 square miles, most of which is agricultural land. There are also large areas of forested land in the watershed.

Course
Deerlick Run starts in northern Mount Pleasant Township, near the community of Welliversville. It flows southeast for a number of miles in a fairly shallow valley to the eastern part of Mount Pleasant Township. Here, the stream turns eastward and exits Mount Pleasant Township. Upon exiting the township, it enters Orange Township. The stream then exits its valley and enters a plain. Shortly afterwards, it reaches its confluence with Fishing Creek. The confluence is slightly north of Pennsylvania Route 487 and slightly south of a gauging station.

Deerlick Run has no named tributaries.

Hydrology and climate

Deerlick Run experiences significant levels of siltation and stream bank erosion. The erosion coefficient of Deerlick Run ranges from 0.12 between September and March to 0.3 during the rest of the year.

Deerlick Run has little riparian buffering. No part of the stream or any of its tributaries attains the water quality standards of the Pennsylvania Department of Environmental Protection.

Geography and geology
The stream is in the ridge and valley geographical region.

80 percent of the surface rock in the watershed of Deerlick Run is interbedded sedimentary rock. 20 percent of the surface rock is sandstone The dominant hydrologic soil groups in the Deerlick Run watershed are C (90%) and B (10%).

Watershed
The watershed of Deerlick Run has an area of 6.1 square miles.

The majority of the watershed of Deerlick Run (60.8 percent) is agricultural land. 1134.2 acres are used for hay or pastures and 1213.3 acres are used for crops. 34.9 percent of the watershed's land is forested land. 4.0 percent of the land is designated by the Pennsylvania Department of Environmental Protection as "low-intensity development". 0.3 percent of the watershed's area is wetland. 9.9 acres of land in the watershed are classified as "transitional" by the Pennsylvania Department of Environmental Protection.

History
In 1853, Deerlick Run was part of the border between Columbia County and Montour County. However, in the 21st century, it is near the center of Columbia County.

In the past, the valley of Deerlick Run was home to many industries, although little is known about them. The remains of a dam can be seen on the stream and there was once a gin mill, a sawmill, and a woolen mill. A mill known as the Behm Mill was built on the stream in 1801. An ice house also was once built near the stream.

Biology
Deerlick Run is designated as a coldwater fishery because it can support fish species of the family Salmonidae. It is also designated as a migratory fishery because it is in the Susquehanna River watershed.

See also
List of tributaries of Fishing Creek (North Branch Susquehanna River)
Green Creek (Fishing Creek)
Stony Brook (Fishing Creek)

References

Rivers of Columbia County, Pennsylvania
Tributaries of Fishing Creek (North Branch Susquehanna River)
Rivers of Pennsylvania